The Left-wing Workers was a political party in Estonia.

History
The party was a front for the Communist Party, which had used umbrella organisations to participate in politics since being banned in 1918. In the 1932 elections it won five seats, a decrease on the six seats the Communists had won in the 1929 elections running under the guise of the Estonian Workers' Party.

Along with all others, the party was banned in 1935 following Konstantin Päts's self-coup.

References

Defunct political parties in Estonia
Communist parties in Estonia
Political parties disestablished in 1935
1935 disestablishments in Estonia